USCGC Harriet Lane refers to three ships of the United States Coast Guard:
 , a revenue cutter serving in the United States Revenue Cutter Service 1861–1881
 , a 125-foot cutter in service with the Coast Guard 1926–1946
 , a medium-endurance cutter active in service with the Coast Guard, commissioned 1984

United States Coast Guard ship names